The Games Maker is a 2014 Argentine-Canadian adventure film co-written and directed by Juan Pablo Buscarini.

Plot summary 
Young Ivan Drago places first in a mail-in contest for board game inventors, only to be disappointed after receiving the grand prize of a temporary tattoo. However, he soon discovers his tattoo is permanent, prompting his father to reach out to Ivan's long-estranged grandfather. Soon after, Ivan's parents are lost in a balloon race, whereupon Ivan is placed in a strict school, where classmates and teachers alike constantly show their dislike for him. Ivan escapes the school to run away to his grandfather in Zyl, the games capital. Once there, Ivan learns that his tattoo matches a missing piece in the town jigsaw puzzle, and is a symbol of Morodian, the man who stole the puzzle piece and is responsible for Zyl's downfall as the greatest game-making town. Ivan runs off to confront Morodian, who had been tracking Ivan his whole life, and was responsible for the disappearance of Ivan's parents. Morodian puts Ivan to work as his personal games maker, but Ivan escapes with the missing puzzle piece and his parents, who Morodian was keeping hostage. With Morodian vanquished, Ivan replaces the missing puzzle piece, his father is reunited with Ivan's grandfather, and Zyl is restored to its former glory.

Cast 
 David Mazouz as Ivan Drago
 Ed Asner as Nicholas Drago 
 Joseph Fiennes as Morodian
 Tom Cavanagh as Mr. Drago
 Valentina Lodovini as Mrs. Drago
 Megan Charpentier as Anunciacion
 Robert Verlaque as Principal Possum
 Alejandro Awada as Engineer Gabler
  as Ramuz
  as Miss Blum

Reception 
The Games Maker received mixed reviews. On review aggregator website Rotten Tomatoes, it has a 40% approval rating based on 5 reviews, and an average rating score of 4.6/10.

References

External links 
 
 The Games Maker at Library and Archives Canada

2010s adventure films
2014 fantasy films
2010s children's films
Canadian adventure films
Argentine adventure films
Italian adventure films
English-language Argentine films
English-language Canadian films
English-language Italian films
Films shot in Buenos Aires
2010s English-language films
2010s Canadian films
2010s Argentine films